The Mullsjö Mission Covenant Church is a church building in Mullsjö, Sweden. It belongs to both the Uniting Church in Sweden and the Swedish Alliance Mission. The current building was opened in 1992 and replaced an older building dated back to 1922.

References

External links
Mullsjö Mission Covenant Congregation 

20th-century churches in Sweden
Churches in Mullsjö Municipality
Mullsjö
Churches completed in 1992
Swedish Alliance Mission churches
Uniting Church in Sweden churches
1992 establishments in Sweden